Sabrina: Secrets of a Teenage Witch is a computer-animated television series on the Hub Network based on the Archie Comics series Sabrina the Teenage Witch. The series was co-produced by MoonScoop Entertainment/Splash Entertainment, MoonScoop Group, DSK Entertainment, Laughing Lion, Telegael Teoranta, and Archie Comics Publications, Inc. with the participation of The Walt Disney Company. The series was developed by Pamela Hickey and Dennys McCoy and was acquired by the Hub Network on October 1, 2012.

The series was originally intended for a summer 2013 release but was delayed to fall 2013.

Premise
The series tells the story of a young teenager named Sabrina Spellman, who is born as a half-witch and a half-human. She lives a double life as a normal high school student and as a sorceress-in-training in the magical world. Once her two worlds collide, Sabrina is the only one who has the rate mystical ability to battle her enemies while also attempting to maintain her secret identity/life as a half witch from all of the humans around her.

Unlike previous versions, Sabrina is shown to be a witch princess; as she is destined to rule all of the magical world one day as queen. Sabrina's pet; is a black cat, named Salem, who is a spy sent by Enchantra to make Sabrina's life in the human world unbearable enough to live in the witch world permanently; in order for Enchantra to drain Sabrina of her great magical powers, and become the strongest and the most feared sorceress in all of Witch World.

Voice cast
 Ashley Tisdale as 16-year-old Sabrina Spellman, the main character.
 Ian James Corlett as Salem, Sabrina's cat/Professor Geist, a Scottish warlock and teacher at Witch School.
 Tabitha St. Germain as Hilda Spellman, one of Sabrina's paternal aunts. She is quite cheerful and outgoing. She wears spectacles and is plump. 
 Veralupa, a good friend of Sabrina's at Witch School who is a werewolf/witch hybrid. Her magic is yellow like her outfit. 
 Erin Mathews as Zelda Spellman, Hilda's older sister and Sabrina's other paternal aunt whom she lives with in the bakery Spellman's Brew.
 Jessie, an African American friend of Sabrina in the mortal world, and the only human who knows and accepts Sabrina and her developing witch magic.
 Maryke Hendrikse as Amy, a snobby and arrogant girl at Greendale High School who expresses how weird she thinks Sabrina is.
 Kathleen Barr as Enchantra, the evil, racist and peer-pressuring principal of Witch School who wants to take over the world by attempting to make Sabrina remain in the magical world as queen. She would then drain the teenage queen of all of her magical powers and rule Witch World with absolute power.
 Tiffany Titan, a grumpy security guard at Sabrina's human school who believes in the existence of magic and witches, and will do anything to prove it. 
 Londa and Zonda, fraternal twins who are friends with Sabrina, Ambrose and Veralupa. Londa has orange hair and Zonda has blue hair. 
 Matthew Erickson as Harvey Kinkle, a nerdy boy who accidentally and unknowingly becomes a mindless werewolf every full moon but is successfully cured in Episode 10.
 Andrew Francis as Ambrose, Sabrina's first cousin.
 James Higuchi as Shinji, Enchantra's bratty son who hates Sabrina.
 David A. Kaye as Jim, Sabrina's crush in the mortal world.
 Rebecca Shoichet as Spella, Enchantra's evil older sister who debuted in the Season 1 finale bearing her name. She is defeated by the combined magics of her younger sister, her nephew, Sabrina, Ambrose, Veralupa, Professor Geist, Zonda and Londa.

Episodes

References

External links
 

2013 American television series debuts
2014 American television series endings
2010s American animated television series
2013 Canadian television series debuts
2014 Canadian television series endings
2010s Canadian animated television series
2013 French television series debuts
2014 French television series endings
2010s French animated television series
2013 Irish television series debuts
2014 Irish television series endings
2013 Indian television series debuts
2014 Indian television series endings
Discovery Family original programming
American computer-animated television series
Sabrina the Teenage Witch
American children's animated action television series
American children's animated adventure television series
American children's animated comedy television series
American children's animated fantasy television series
Canadian children's animated action television series
Canadian children's animated adventure television series
Canadian children's animated comedy television series
Canadian children's animated fantasy television series
French children's animated action television series
French children's animated adventure television series
French children's animated comedy television series
French children's animated fantasy television series
Indian children's animated action television series
Indian children's animated adventure television series
Indian children's animated comedy television series
Indian children's animated fantasy television series
Irish children's animated action television series
Irish children's animated adventure television series
Irish children's animated comedy television series
Irish children's animated fantasy television series
Television series about witchcraft
Television shows based on Archie Comics
American animated television spin-offs
Canadian animated television spin-offs
French animated television spin-offs
Television series by Splash Entertainment
Animated television series about cats
English-language television shows
Teen animated television series